Sir Wilfred Alan Westerman  (25 March 1913 – 18 May 2001) was a senior Australian public servant and policymaker.

Life and career
Alan Westerman was born in New Zealand on 25 March 1913. He was educated at Knox Grammar School, the University of Tasmania, the University of Melbourne and Columbia University.

After World War II, Westerman joined the Australian Trade Commissioner Service, staying in the organisation between 1946 and 1949.

He was appointed Secretary of the Department of Trade in September 1960, becoming Secretary of the Department of Trade and Industry when the new department was established in 1963. His contribution to trade policy occurred at a significant time in Australia's international trading history, as the nation was seeking markets for its ever-increasing industrial products.

Westerman retired from his Secretary role when he was appointed executive chairman of the Australian Industry Development Corporation beginning February 1971.

Awards and honours
Westerman was made a Commander of the Order of the British Empire in 1962. In 1963, he was made a Knight Bachelor.

In 2009, a street in the Canberra suburb of Casey was named Westerman Street in Alan Westerman's honour.

References

1913 births
2001 deaths
Australian Commanders of the Order of the British Empire
Australian Knights Bachelor
Australian public servants

20th-century Australian public servants